Clemens Hasse (13 April 1908 – 28 July 1959) was a German actor and synchroniser.

Biography
Hasse was born in Königsberg, East Prussia to a public official and attended his stage education at the Preussisches Staatstheater  in Berlin. Between 1929 and 1944, when the Theater was closed down, he was a constant member of the Staatstheater ensemble.

Hasse first appeared in a UFA movie in 1932 and acted in several movies next to popular stars like Heinz Rühmann or Hans Albers. He was the German dubbing voice of Eddie Albert, Lou Costello, José Ferrer, Oliver Hardy, Sid James and also the voice of the white rabbit in Disneys Alice in Wonderland.

After World War II Hasse worked at the Schlosspark-Theater Berlin and after 1951 at the Schillertheater. He died of a heart attack at New York City on the occasion of his daughter's marriage and is buried at Waldfriedhof Dahlem in Berlin.

Filmography

External links
 
 
picture of 1934
Clemens Hasse at www.cyranos.ch

1908 births
1959 deaths
German male film actors
German male stage actors
Actors from Königsberg
People from East Prussia
20th-century German male actors